The March 847 was a British sports prototype racing car, built by March Engineering in 1984 for the Can-Am series. As with all other full-size Can-Am cars of the time, it used a mid-mounted 5-litre, naturally-aspirated Chevrolet V8 engine. It was driven by Jim Crawford for RK Racing/United Breweries, scoring 3 wins. Jim Crawford and the March 847 chassis would both successfully finish the championship as runner-up at the end of the season.

References

Sports prototypes
Can-Am cars
March vehicles